Gwynfryn can represent more than one place, including:

Gwynfryn, Gwynedd, Wales
Gwynfryn, Wrexham, Wales
Gwynfryn, London, London